Energia or Energiya may refer to:
 Energia (corporation), or S. P. Korolev Rocket and Space Corporation Energia, a Russian design bureau and manufacturer
 Energia (rocket), a Soviet rocket designed by the company
Energia (company), a company that supplies gas and electricity in Northern Ireland and the Republic of Ireland
Chugoku Electric Power Company, a Japanese electric utility which trades as EnerGia
Energia (moth), a moth genus
Energia (dev system), a fork/port of Arduino
Energeia, the general principle of "activity" as opposed to possibility, in Aristotelianism
Energy, a physical quantity that describes the amount of work that can be performed by a force

Entertainment
Energia (band), a British band
Energia (album), a 2016 album by Colombian singer J Balvin
"Energia", a 2012 single by Mexican rock band Zoé
Energia Kemerovo, a Russian ice hockey team from Kemerovo

See also 
Energy (disambiguation)
Energie (disambiguation)
Enerhiya (disambiguation)